Jani Uotinen (born 17 May 1978) is a Finnish former footballer. He played for two seasons in the Scottish Football League with Greenock Morton as a central midfielder.

In his homeland, he has played internationally for Finland's Futsal side as well as playing for MyPa, VPS and retired in July 2009 after playing with Vasa IFK (whom he joined in January 2009).

Coaching career
After retiring, it was announced in October 2009 that Uotinen had been hired as a youth coach for his former club VPS, having already worked as a youth coach for VPS earlier.

In 2014, he moved to FC Jazz where he was hired as a youth coach as well. However, in August 2014, he was appointed first team manager for the rest of the season after the departure of Jouni Joensuu. Uotinen was in charge for 10 games, picking up 13 points, before the club at the end of October 2018 announced, that he would continue in his role as a youth coach. In July 2016, he was once again appointed first team manager for the rest of the season, this time after the departure of John Allen.

Uotinen left Jazz at the end of the season after it was announced already in November 2016, that he would join TPS as academy coach from the new year. He left in November 2017 where his contract expired and it was immediately announced, that he would continue at SJK from the new year as an academy coach and manager of the club's U23 team. He left the position in July 2019 and became the manager of KPV.

Honours

Greenock Morton
 Scottish Football League Third Division: 1
 2002–03

External links

References

1978 births
Living people
People from Kuusankoski
Expatriate footballers in Scotland
Finnish expatriate footballers
Greenock Morton F.C. players
Scottish Football League players
Finnish footballers
Association football midfielders
Myllykosken Pallo −47 players
Veikkausliiga players
Vaasan Palloseura players
Finnish men's futsal players
Reipas Lahti players
Sportspeople from Kymenlaakso